The politics of outer space includes space treaties, law in space, international cooperation and conflict in space exploration, international economics and the hypothetical political impact of any contact with extraterrestrial intelligence.

Astropolitics, also known as astropolitic, has its foundations in geopolitics and is a theory that is used for space in its broadest sense.

An important aspect of the geopolitics of space is the prevention of a military threat to Earth from outer space.

International cooperation on space projects has resulted in the creation of new national space agencies. By 2005 there were 35 national civilian space agencies.

Treaties and policies related to outer space

Outer Space Treaty

Moon Treaty

Artemis Accords 

The Artemis Accords builds on a number of treaties that affect the conduct of States and their commercial industries in the exploration and use of space, including the 1967 Outer Space Treaty, the 1972 Liability Convention and the 1975 Registration Convention.
NASA has stated that in leading the Artemis program, international partnerships will prepare for a historic human mission to Mars while playing a key role in achieving a sustainable and robust presence on the Moon. The core of the Artemis agreement requires that all activities be conducted for peaceful purposes, consistent with the principles of the Outer Space Treaty. International cooperation under the Artemis Agreement aims not only to promote space exploration, but also to strengthen peaceful relations between nations.

Post-detection policy

Politics of the ISS

Politics of Asteroid mining 
In recent years the advancement in technology and engineering have made mining asteroid seem like an attainable endeavour. The global space mining market is estimated to be worth USD 14.71 billion by 2025, as indicated by market research. Although the industry could be years away from successfully mining asteroids, this renewed interest in asteroid mining for metal extraction has the potential to influence the global market of rare metal and create a new geopolitical order.

Outer space has been a ground for geopolitical competition since the Cold War, and the expected growth in asteroid mining could bring about a new geopolitical order organized around resources extraction. Access to rare metals from asteroids could position nation-states and their private sectors competitively. Countries with technological capacity to explore space and finance a new and costly asteroid mining endeavour are better positioned to dominate the global supply chain for such metals, while a handful of countries will lag behind. This threatens to drive a resource race in outer space and could create similar patterns of conflict around resources extraction to what has been experienced on earth.

The expansion of resource extraction in outer space will require the development of a legal regulatory framework that adequately governs asteroid mining activities. The two current treaties that govern activities in outer space are the Outer Space Treaty and the Moon Treaty. Ratified by 98 countries in 1976, the Outer Space Treaty prevents sovereign or private ownership of outer space and its resources, asserting it belongs to all mankind but does not prevent exploitation of its resources. Ratified in 1979, the Moon Treaty clears some of the vague language surrounding the heritage for humankind outline in the Outer Space Treaty. Similar to the Outer Space Treaty, its provisions outline the moon and other celestial bodies are “not subject to national appropriation by claim of sovereignty, by means of use or occupation, or by any other means” It also introduces a number of provisions that limit activities in outer space. While those provisions have implications for the development of space mining industry, Article 11.7 of the treaty has serious implications for countries that wish to assert monopoly over the emerging asteroid mining industry.

Article 11.7: The main purposes of the international regime to be established shall include:

1.  The orderly and safe development of the natural resources of the moon;

2.  The rational management of those resources;

3.  The expansion of opportunities in the use of those resources;

4.  An equitable sharing by all States Parties in the benefits derived from those resources, whereby the interests and needs of the developing countries, as well as the efforts of those countries which have contributed either directly or indirectly to the exploration of the moon, shall be given special consideration.

Given the limitation the moon treaty place on states, it has not been ratified by key players in the space frontier, such as the US, China, and Russia.

Both the Outer Space Treaty and the Moon Treaty lack a robust enforcement mechanism that holds states and private entities accountable for their violation of the agreements. The lack of clarity over claims for ownership could result in conflicts among countries and private companies. While International efforts to reconsolidate a regulatory framework to govern future mining activities are much needed, they have been slow. Establishing rules on transparency, resource sharing, and mechanisms to guide conflict resolutions are needed to support the growing economy of asteroid mining.

Several countries have conducted research missions to asteroid. While the US, EU, Japan, Russia, and China have all had successful steroid missions, only the US and Japan were able to bring samples from an asteroid. With geological surveys for metals often preceding the militarization of territories and the expansion of nation-states in terrestrial context, research missions to asteroids allude to the expansion of state ambition to dominate a large-scale extra-terrestrial extractive regime.

While asteroid mining remains in its infancy, countries are competing to dominate it. However, the difficulty of reaching consensus on global treaties has led countries to branch out to legitimatize the economic exploration and exploitation of asteroids, through passing national law, and relying on loopholes in the international law.

In 2015, the US passed the U.S Commercial Space Launch Competitiveness Act. While the act does not position the US as a state to have authority or ownership in outer space, it positions its citizens to have ownership over resources acquired from space. This allows the U.S to adhere to Outer Space Treaty but also allow to its private entities to carry out mining activities on Asteroids, once feasible. AstroForge, a US start-up with a mission focused on developing technology for asteroid mining, announced two commercial missions to asteroids to be launched in 2023.

In 2016, the government of Luxembourg introduced a legal framework that support and guide the private activities of mining asteroids. To grant certainty investors, it passed a law that explicitly permits private entities to own and sell resources extracted from asteroids. The government also pledged to support research and start-ups focused on space exploration and extra-terrestrial resource extraction with a funding of approximately USD $225 million. Relative to the US, the Luxembourg Space Act provides more clarity and position the country more competitively to engage in asteroid mining. Given its strategic location in Europe, Luxembourg intends to establish itself as a Silicon Valley for space activities.

Despite the difference in passed legislations, the goal is the same: to emerge as a leader in the new asteroid mining frontier and obtain the economic benefit associated with it. Current and future development in asteroid mining do not intel on whether such competition in this frontier will lead to positive changes in international law or allow a harmonization of notational laws among states. Yet, the steady growth in asteroid mining will have implications for geopolitics of terrestrial and extra-terrestrial resource extraction.

Colonialism and imperialism

Neoliberal advocacy 
The trend towards the economicisation of outer space under neoliberalism is having a profound impact on the political ecology of outer space.

Outer space is becoming a space for capitalism. A new era of space commercialisation aims to profit from satellite launches, space tourism, asteroid mining and related ventures. This era, driven by private companies such as Elon Musk's SpaceX and Jeff Bezos' Blue Origin, has been dubbed "the new space" by industry insiders." Spatial justice in outer space increasingly means the 'justice' of capital, with capitalism replacing humanity."

Since the mid-20th century, space expansionism has become a popular ideology and, thanks to science, the emergence of technological civilization, and the spread of neoliberalism, it has become possible for a wide range of actors, such as national armies and government agencies, scientists and private companies, to carry out a variety of space activities, such as the regulation of outer space through international law, the deployment of missile and anti-satellite weapons, the establishment of exploration, communication and navigation satellites, and space travel for tourism and habitat expansion. Since the mid-twentieth century, spatial expansionism has gone hand in hand with the concept of the world as a 'planetary earth' - going beyond the concept of a 'global earth' associated with the industrial revolution.

There are always costs and benefits in environmental change and these are unevenly distributed along lines of class, race, ethnicity, gender, and geography (among other axes of difference). The environmental geopolitics of outer space is similarly multi-scale, manifesting itself in contemporary debates on pollution issues such as orbital debris and planetary protection agreements. The cultural, legal, budgetary, and infrastructural footprints experienced in the contemporary space race have measurable environmental footprints on Earth and in outer space. The question of where these footprints fall is arbitrated by larger issues of geopolitical power and vulnerability, which means that human participation in outer space is also a matter of environmental justice.

See also 
 Astrosociology
 Extraterrestrial Real Estate
 Human Presence in Space
 International Space Station
 Politics of the International Space Station
 Space Advocacy
 Space Colonialism
 Space Policy
 Space Race
 Space Warfare
 United Nations Office for Outer Space Affairs
 Whitey on the Moon

References
 D. Deudney and M. Glassner; Political Geography

Further reading
Dolman, Everett C. Ed. Colin S. Gray and Geoffrey Sloan. "Geostrategy in the Space Age."  Geopolitics, Geography and Strategy.  Frank Cass: Portland, Oregon, 2003. pp. 83–106. 
^ Eric Cardiff of NASA's Goddard Space Flight Center, as quoted at http://www.physorg.com/news66314743.html

External links

 Astropolitics.The International Journal of Space Politics & Policy
"Assault on the Sky", by Lucio Caracciolo, from Limes 5/2004

Outer space
space
Geopolitics